The Luther Burbank School District is located in San Jose, California, USA.

Elementary schools
Luther Burbank Elementary School serves 440 students in kindergarten through grade eight, as well as 70 preschoolers. As of the 2020/2021 school year, 90 percent of the student body was Hispanic, 5 percent African American, and 5 percent Asians. 74 percent are English Language learners students.

The school program provides the following programs:

 Experienced Work Force
 High Expectations with Engaging Curriculum
 12:1 adult ratio for grades K-3 for ELA and Math
 15:1 adult ratio for grades 4-8 for ELA and Math
 Enrichment- Arts Wheel, Spanish, Maker Space, Computer Science/Coding, PE, Character/SEL
 Assemblies and Fieldtrips
 Intervention/ELD Specialist
 Counselors, Psychologist, Speech, OT
 1:1 Technology Device for Home and School
 Free Wifi Access (in development)
 Free Breakfast, Lunch, Snack, and Supper
 Free After School Program
 Sports, Homework, STEM, Arts, Music

References

External links
 

School districts in San Jose, California